Pycnonemosaurus (meaning 'dense forest lizard') is a genus of carnivorous theropod dinosaur that belonged to the family Abelisauridae. It was found in the Upper Cretaceous red conglomerate sandstones of the "Cabembe Unit", Mato Grosso, Brazil, and it lived about 70 million years ago during the Late Cretaceous (Maastrichtian stage).

Discovery and naming 

The type species, Pycnonemosaurus nevesi, was formally described by Kellner and Campos in 2002. The only known specimen was found in a red conglomeratic sandstone at the Fazenda Roncador locality, in Mato Grosso State that is exposed close to Paulo Creek, which is referred to an unidentified formation of the Upper Cretaceous Bauru Group. During 1952-1953, Llewellyn Ivor Price visited a farm named "Roncador" in the state of Mato Grosso and collected several dinosaur bones. These remains were found by the owner of the farm, Max de Barros Erhart, and his hired workers at the Paulo Creek site. The most important specimen found was the incomplete skeleton of a large abelisaurid theropod, which was found near several titanosaurid sauropod bones.

Pycnonemosaurus nevesi was named from the Greek word pycnós meaning dense, némos meaning pastures and woods, and saûrus meaning reptile or lizard. This naming was an allusion to Mato Grosso State, where the remains were found. The specific name was named after the late Dr. Iedo Batista Neves, who passed in 2000, who encouraged the pursuit of paleontological studies, particularly of Alexander Kellner.

Description 

Thus far, the remains of Pycnonemosaurus have been fragmentary. No elements were well preserved, and the bone surface is well abraded that indicates the elements were partially exposed at the discovery location before being collected. The type specimen (DGM 859-R), housed at the Earth Sciences Museum, Rio de Janeiro, consists of five incomplete teeth, parts of seven caudal vertebrae, the distal part of a right pubis, a right tibia, and the distal articulation of the right fibula. The small pubic foot and hatchet-shaped cnemial crest of the tibia distinguishes this species within the abelisaurs. The caudal vertebra has distinct abelisaurid features, such as a fan-shaped transverse process and a cranial projection. However, these awl-like projections are somewhat unlike related abelisaurids, such as Aucasaurus, in  that they diminish more towards the distal caudals. All remains were found associated and are presently regarded as belonging to the same individual.

This new size estimate currently makes Pycnonemosaurus the largest formally described member of the Abelisauridae thus far.

Phylogeny 
The following cladogram follows an analysis of 2021 during the description of Llukalkan.

Paleoecology 
Pycnonemosaurus is the best known abelisaurid from Brazil, where most theropod material is presently rare besides preserved teeth and footprints. Even though only a few species are known from Brazil, it is one of the most informative countries concerning the Lower Cretaceous period. Pycnonemosaurus was a predator, preying on mid-sized sauropodomorphs, small crocodylomorphs, and dromaeosaurs. Its teeth were small yet sharp, and were used to get a hold of struggling prey as the abelisaur shook and tore them apart.

See also 

 Timeline of ceratosaur research

References

External links 

  Pycnonemosaurus at Dinosaurier Info

Brachyrostrans
Late Cretaceous dinosaurs of South America
Cretaceous Brazil
Fossils of Brazil
Fossil taxa described in 2002
Taxa named by Alexander Kellner